Cases Computer Simulations (known as CCS) was a video game developer and publisher which specialized in strategy and war games for the ZX Spectrum, a number of which were ported to the BBC Micro, Acorn Electron, Amstrad CPC, and IBM PC.

Their cassette inlays often featured quite stylized pictures and they were renowned for producing a succession of high quality games. Many of their later releases were written by well-known wargamers R T Smith & Ken Wright and received excellent reviews in the mid and late 1980s. They were based at 14, Langton Way, London. SE3 7TL.

Games
Battle 1917 (1983)
United (1984)
Arnhem (1985)
Desert Rats: The North Africa Campaign (1985)
Stalingrad (1988)
Encyclopedia of War: Ancient Battles (1988)

References

Defunct video game companies of the United Kingdom